Jovan Vidović (born 6 January 1989) is a Slovenian footballer who plays as a defender for Slovan.

Club career
Vidović started his football career at local club Šmartno, and later transferred to another Ljubljana-based club Slovan at the age of 13.

In late November 2010 it was announced by Zlatko Zahovič, Maribor's director of football, that Maribor had acquired Vidović on a permanent move as a result of Siniša Anđelković transfer from Maribor to Palermo during the 2010–11 winter transfer window. Domžale president Stane Oražem has confirmed the deal on the same day. The transfer has been made official on 7 December 2010, when Maribor announced it on their official website. He signed a four-year contract with Maribor.

In July 2013, Vidović joined Azerbaijan Premier League side Ravan Baku on a one-year contract with the option of another year.

References

External links
 
 Player profile at NZS 
 

1989 births
Living people
Footballers from Ljubljana
Slovenian people of Serbian descent
Slovenian footballers
Association football defenders
Slovenian PrvaLiga players
3. Liga players
Regionalliga players
NK Domžale players
NK Radomlje players
NK Maribor players
SV Wehen Wiesbaden players
FC Hansa Rostock players
SV Meppen players
SC Weiche Flensburg 08 players
Chemnitzer FC players
Slovenian expatriate footballers
Slovenian expatriate sportspeople in Azerbaijan
Expatriate footballers in Azerbaijan
Slovenian expatriate sportspeople in Germany
Expatriate footballers in Germany
Slovenia youth international footballers
Slovenia under-21 international footballers